Franklin Payne (February 26, 1917 - November 11, 1994) was an American politician who served in the Missouri Senate and the Missouri House of Representatives.  Payne was previously elected to the Missouri House of Representatives in 1966, serving until 1970. He was also a former U.S. marshal in St. Louis. Payne died November 11, 1994, of a heart ailment in Chicago, at the age of 78.

References

Democratic Party members of the Missouri House of Representatives
Democratic Party Missouri state senators
1917 births
1994 deaths